Elephantorrhiza elephantina, commonly known as the eland's wattle or elephant's root, is a subshrub in the mimosoid clade of legumes. They occur widely and in several bioregions of southern Africa. Considerable size variation has been noted, and polyploidy was suspected.

Description
They have a suffrutescent habit typical of their genus. They produce unbranched and unarmed aerial stems of less than a metre tall. The various populations show considerable variation in terms of the number of pinnae pairs and the number, size and shape of the leaflets. They flower from September to November and are pollinated mainly by the African honeybee. The flowering racemes are typically confined to the lower part of the stem, so that the pods are usually suspended just above ground level, or alternatively rest inconspicuously on the ground.

Similar species
Elephantorrhiza burkei has similar aerial parts, but its seeds are consistently smaller than those of E. elephantina. Mature specimens of E. burkei especially, produce their flowering racemes on the branched stems, so that the pods appear in conspicuous positions some distance above ground. Seed shape varies considerably in E. burkei, from elliptic to nearly quadrate if they are tightly compacted and laterally compressed in their pods. In either species the two pod valves will separate from their margin, which persists as a nearly continuous and empty frame, reminiscent of some Entada pods. Pods of E. elephantina generally disintegrate and disappear more rapidly than those of E. burkei, where the two pod valves roll back and persist with their margins for many months.

Gallery

References

Mimosoids
Flora of Namibia
Endangered plants
Geoxyles